The Serra de Monchique (Monchique Range) is a chain of mountains in the western part of the Algarve region of Portugal, about 20 km inshore. The chain's highest point is the peak of Fóia, at 902 m. 774 m high Picota is another notable peak.

Description
The Monchique Range is the southwesternmost mountain range of the Iberian Peninsula. It is covered in forest and parts of the range have been transformed into eucalyptus, pine and acacia plantations which are detrimental to the native forest cover.
The range is named after the town of Monchique, located in the area.
Caldas de Monchique is a well-known spa town with geothermal springs also located in this range.

Rivers Seixe, Aljezur and Odiáxere have their sources in this range.

Geology
The Monchique Range is part of the Late-Cretaceous Iberian Alkaline Igneous Province and is related to the Mount Ormonde seamount in the Gorringe Bank. The inselberg is formed primarily of nepheline-syenites (foyaite, for which 'Foia' is the type locality). At c.63 km2 Monchique the fourth largest miaskitic nepheline-syenite intrusion so far discovered. It is assumed to be of 'laccolithic' form, from its regular contact altitude to the Breijera formation (country rock). Pegmatites of similar foyaitic composition are seen within the mass at two locations and an associated dyke swarm of lamprophyres and picrites extends some 3 km from the mountain. the psammite/shale/marl country rocks of the Breijera formation are well exposed to the west of Serra de Monchique, forming jagged outcrops and dramatic gorges, which since the destructive introduction of eucalyptus farming in 1976, now run dry most of the year round.

Ecology 
Serra de Monchique is threatened by continued aggressive eucalyptus 'cash-crop' farming, recent publications have shown the water table to be lowering significantly and many endemic species to be on the brink of extinction, including the Bonellis Eagle, the Iberian emerald lizard and many more listed under European Union protection.

See also
Geography of Portugal
Geology of the Iberian Peninsula

References

External links

Around Monchique and the mountains

Mountain ranges of Portugal
Natura 2000 in Portugal